In European elections, the member state of Poland is subdivided into constituencies. However, the number of seats in each subconstituency is not decided until after the election. Poland therefore is sometimes treated as a single constituency for purposes of reportage.

2004

The 2004 European election was the sixth election to the European Parliament. However, as Poland had only joined the European Union earlier that month, it was the first election European election held in that state. The election took place on 13 June.

The elections resulted in a heavy defeat for the governing Alliance of the Democratic Left and Labor Union parties, although the very low turnout makes a direct comparison with national election results difficult. As expected the most successful party was the Civic Platform. Second place was taken by the strongly anti-EU League of Polish Families.

The radical populist Self-Defense of the Polish Republic, which some opinion polls had predicted would come second, came fourth after the Law and Justice party. The election results were a success for Social Democracy of Poland, which managed to cross the required 5% threshold, and the Freedom Union, which got over twice the expected percentage of votes.

2009

The 2009 European Parliament election in Poland was on Sunday 7 June 2009 and the number of seats was 50.

References

External links
 European Election News by European Election Law Association (Eurela)
 List of MEPs europarl.europa.eu

Europe
European Parliament constituencies in Poland